Sebka refers to a type of decorative motif used in western Islamic ("Moorish") architecture and Mudéjar architecture.

History and description 
Various types of interlacing rhombus-like motifs are heavily featured on the surfaces of minarets and other architectural elements in Morocco and al-Andalus during the Almohad period (12th–13th centuries). They continued to spread to other decorative mediums such as carved stucco over the walls of various buildings in Marinid and Nasrid architecture, eventually becoming a standard feature in the western Islamic ornamental repertoire, often in combination with arabesque elements. 

George Marçais, an important 20th-century scholar on the architecture of the region, argues that this motif originated with the complex interlacing arches in the 10th-century extension of the Great Mosque of Cordoba by Caliph al-Hakam II. It was then miniaturized and widened into a repeating net-like pattern that can cover surfaces. This motif, in turn, had many detailed variations. One common version, called darj wa ktaf ("step and shoulder") by Moroccan craftsmen, makes use of alternating straight and curved lines which cross each other on their symmetrical axes, forming a khamsa motif that looks roughly like a fleur-de-lis or palmette-like shape. Another version, also commonly found on minarets in alternation with the darj wa ktaf, consists of interlacing multifoil/polylobed arches to form a more rounded lobed shape.

References 

Architecture in Morocco
Islamic art
Visual motifs
Moorish architecture